Krypto, also known as Krypto the Superdog, is a fictional superhero dog appearing in American comic books published by DC Comics, commonly in association with the character Superman. In most continuities, Krypto is Superman's pet dog, usually depicted as a white dog of a generic pedigree. Krypto is sometimes depicted as resembling a Labrador Retriever, a plain white Dalmatian, a White Shepherd, or even a primitive dog such as a spitz-type dog such as a husky or a laika, a dingo (in Australian versions), a pye-dog (in Indian versions), or a tugou (in Chinese versions), but his specific breed is almost never specified.

Krypto has appeared in numerous cartoon television shows and films, such as a self-titled animated series; the television series Smallville, the HBO Max series Titans, portrayed by dog actors Wrigley, Digby, and Lacey; and the animated film DC League of Super-Pets (2022), voiced by Dwayne Johnson.

Publication history
Krypto's first appearance was in a Superboy adventure  story in Adventure Comics #210 (March 1955), and was created by writer Otto Binder and artist Curt Swan. Originally intended as a one-off character, the dog attracted positive attention from the audience, and returned four issues later and became a regular member of Superboy's cast.

Character biography

The original Krypto

On Krypton, parallel evolution leads to the emergence of analogous species to Terran birds, felids, canids, and simians. They are domestic companion animals as they are on Earth. As explained in his first appearance, Krypto is originally the dog of toddler Kal-El while they are on Krypton. Jor-El, testing prototypes for the rocket that eventually sends Kal-El to Earth, decides to use Krypto as a test subject. However, Krypto's rocket is knocked off-course; the rocket drifts through space for years until it eventually lands on Earth, where Krypto is reunited with the now-teenaged superhero, Superboy. Due to the environment (Earth's yellow sun and lower gravity), Krypto possesses the same powers and abilities as his master, although his physical abilities are proportionate to his smaller size and species. Certain sensory abilities of Krypto's (senses of smell and hearing) are more acute than those of Superman, just as an ordinary dog's senses are more acute than those of an ordinary human. Krypto also has super-canine intelligence (approximately human level, though with his canine traits and interests still present); the comics expressed this via the use of thought balloons indicating what Krypto thinks.

Krypto is drawn as a white dog of generic pedigree. The early appearances of the character in the comics usually feature exaggerated anthropomorphic facial expressions; these are replaced in later appearances by a more generic canine face. When fighting crime, Krypto usually wears a gold collar, a miniature facsimile of the famed Superman-"S" symbol for a dog tag, and a dog-sized version of Superman's cape. Whenever he is on Earth and wants to appear as an "ordinary" dog, Krypto simply pulls his collar and its attached cape off, pulling it back on when necessary. In one story, he is gifted with a collar which contains a retractable cape that can be unfurled or hidden by pressing a stud.

When not accompanying Superboy/Superman, Krypto spends much of his time romping through space; while on Earth, however, he stays with the Kent family, posing as their pet dog, "Skip". In that identity, his guardians apply a brown dye patch on his back for a disguise which Krypto burns off with his heat vision when he goes into costume; later, the Kents devise a pullcord-activated dye applicator and other methods which Krypto can use to switch to "Skip" and back without assistance.

Krypto has the distinction of belonging to two organizations of super-animals: the 30th century Legion of Super-Pets, and the Space Canine Patrol Agents. After the 1971 revamp of Superman by editor Julius Schwartz, Krypto makes no appearances for several years. The character returns suffering from amnesia in a 1974 two-part Green Arrow backup story in Action Comics #440 and #441. His memory is restored in 1975's Superman #287. Asked in a 2006 interview why he "liberated Krypto from the limbo kennel", writer Elliot S. Maggin said, "A man needs a dog. A superman needs a superdog."

Krypto had his own feature in The Superman Family #182 (March–April 1977) to #192 (November–December 1978) and it was written by Bob Toomey.

In the final (non-canonical) pre-Crisis Superman story, Alan Moore's Whatever Happened To The Man of Tomorrow?, Krypto saves Superman by biting the throat out of the Kryptonite Man. Krypto is irradiated in the process and dies with the villain.

In Superboy #126 (Jan. 1966) "Krypto's Family Tree", Krypto's father's name is given as Zypto, his grandfather as Nypto, and his great-grandfather as Vypto.

The modern Krypto

Pocket universe Krypto
Following the 1985-1986 Crisis on Infinite Earths limited series, Superman's history is extensively rewritten, initially eliminating all other survivors of Krypton in the revised version of his origin, including Krypto, so as to once again make the premise that Superman is truly the "Last Son of Krypton" a valid one.

Eventually Krypto in several forms is reintroduced to the Superman mythos, the first being as essentially an exact copy of the pre-crisis Krypto existing in a pocket universe created by the Time Trapper. In this early Post-Crisis storyline, Superman finds himself in this pocket universe in which, similar to the Pre-Crisis Earth Prime of Superboy-Prime, his teenage counterpart is the only superhuman on Earth. Combatting the genocidal forces of three Phantom Zone criminals, this alternate Superboy has an intelligent Krypto counterpart as well, who heroically sacrifices his powers for his master to provide him with gold kryptonite to defeat his enemy. This is the same pocket reality from which the "Matrix" Supergirl originates.

Krypto and Bibbo
The second modern Krypto is a small white pet dog, rescued, and later named by Bibbo Bibbowski. Originally, Bibbo wanted to name the dog "Krypton" after Superman's home planet. However, the engraver of the dog tag (knowing that Bibbo recently won the lottery) intentionally drops the letter "n" ("Six letters or less for 1 dollar"), so he is trying to extort more money from Bibbo; an angry Bibbo refuses to comply and renames the dog "Krypto." Soon after, the dog finds two young children who were trapped in a bomb shelter for a month following Superman's fight with Doomsday. The children are badly malnourished and dehydrated, but it is learned that they survive and recover. This gives Superman the idea to explain Clark Kent's long absence by staging a faked rescue from a similar predicament.

Krypto is later acquired by the modern Superboy; however, this version of Krypto is an ordinary Earth dog with no superpowers. The dog and Kon-El do not get along. For a time, Krypto's friends are agent Rex Leech, Rex's daughter Roxy, a being from the genetically engineered race at Cadmus called "DNAliens" known as Dubbilex, and TV reporter Tana Moon. Krypto becomes involved in many of Superboy's adventures. The dog is eventually dropped from the series, remaining in Hawaii when Superboy returns to Project Cadmus. Superboy's friends believe him to be missing and Krypto is left in the care of Hillary, a young neighbor that he likes. After Superboy #69 of that series, the dog goes to live at Cadmus. Krypto, a creature called Grokk the Living Gargoyle, and a DNAlien named Angry Charlie, start an uprising against the Agenda, an evil consortium which is influencing Cadmus at the time. After battling a DNAlien named the Gene-gnome, Krypto is never seen again, his last appearance in Superboy #74.

The dog from Krypton

The third and more familiar version of Krypto is introduced in the early 2000s Superman comics storyline Return to Krypton, as a dog from a false, idealized Krypton (that coincidentally resembles the pre-Crisis Krypton) that is created as a trap by Brainiac 13. Superman is able to defeat the trap, and when he returns to Earth, Krypto follows him.

This new version of Krypto has all the physical abilities of his pre-Crisis predecessor, but with a normal canine intellect. This initially causes a great deal of trouble for his new master when, for instance, he would scratch at a door to indicate he wanted to go out and unintentionally gouged big chunks out of the door with his super strength, or inflicting grievous bodily harm when combating villains (since Krypto bites the way a regular canine would, only without being careful about his super strength). As a result, Krypto is for some time locked away in the Fortress of Solitude under the care of one of Superman's robots. This robot is programmed to emit the scent of the dog's real master. Superman has gone to great lengths to train the dog, and he now occasionally accompanies the Man of Steel on missions. Batman never misses an opportunity to poke fun at Krypto when Batman and Superman don't see eye-to-eye.

Krypto operates on his own for a short period of time, helping out when disasters rocked the planet because of the plans of the invading Imperiex. He is shown rescuing endangered people.

In the "Hush" story arc, Batman uses Krypto to sniff out the whereabouts of Poison Ivy after she uses kryptonite lipstick to gain control of Superman. It also appears that Krypto has taken a great liking to Catwoman, much to her immense displeasure.

Krypto is part of the rescue force put together late in the Superman/Batman storyline "Public Enemies" (#1-6). Thinking Batman and Superman needed to be rescued from President Lex Luthor, a small team of superheroes, which includes such heroes as Superboy, Nightwing, and Robin, invade the White House. Krypto destroys part of the upper floors while subduing some Secret Service agents.

Krypto has a surprisingly violent reaction to Kara Zor-El when he first encounters her. The dog happens upon the girl while she was exploring the Fortress of Solitude and attacks, going so far as to use his heat vision and other potentially lethal attacks. Batman, who distrusted Kara at that time, pointed this out as an argument that Kara might not be who she says she is when he remarks "Doesn't it bother you at all that the dog hates her?" Superman's response was "It's his job to protect the fortress while he's here. Besides...the dog hates everybody."

Some time later, Superman left Krypto in the care of Superboy (Kon-El or Conner Kent), saying that Smallville's open spaces were a better place for the dog, and that Superboy could use a friend (as shown in Teen Titans vol. 3, #7). Their relationship had a shaky start, not helped by Krypto getting Superboy in trouble with the superheroine Starfire for destroying her alien garden.

However, they have slowly developed a close friendship, in which Krypto willingly does anything he can to protect Conner. One example of this loyalty was Krypto's quick defense of Conner from an enraged Superboy-Prime. He bit Superboy-Prime in the shoulder. Although Krypto was injured with a punch sending him bouncing down the main street of Smallville, this only strengthened his relationship with Conner. Unfortunately Superboy perishes in battle while destroying a multiverse influence tower that Superboy-Prime helped build.

Krypto makes a brief appearance in JLA #87. The entity known as Fernus took over the mind and body of Martian Manhunter. Krypto is telepathically influenced and uses the Atom as a chew toy. Ray and the League are saved by John Stewart and his injuries are healed by the Flash.

Later, he is mentally influenced by an alien armada being led by the space-faring villain Despero. This is seen in Superman/Batman #32 (March 2007). Along with other Earth-based heroes influenced by alien origins, Krypto attacks Superman and Batman after a gathering in Metropolis. The two titular heroes neutralize the alien threat, freeing the minds of everyone affected.

One year later
Action Comics #850 presents the latest revision of Superman's origin, containing many subtle retcons to Superman: Birthright, the latest major revision of Superman's continuity. The current version indicates that Krypto was indeed the El family dog from the real Krypton (as in the Silver Age), showing an identical white dog present at Kal-El's birth. Although Action #850 does not deal with the specifics of how this dog was sent to Earth or when he arrived (Krypto is not clearly shown in any of the brief scenes of Clark's childhood), subsequent issues of the Superman title have contained references to Krypto being around when he was "young". Both inclusions retconned the origin of the current Krypto hailing from an ersatz Krypton and debuting during Superman's adulthood.

Some time later, a back-up feature in Action Comics Annual #11, written by Geoff Johns, finally clarified the details of the "New Earth" origin of Krypto: "The Kryptonian canine of the House of El, Krypto was sent in a small prototype rocket created by Jor-El. Lost for years, Krypto was eventually found and rescued by Clark when he was a boy." This retcon brings the modern Krypto almost identically in line with the original Silver Age version.

Krypto goes missing for over a year following the death of his previous owner Conner Kent, but Superman is unable to devote much time to search for him, having himself been without powers for much of that time. Krypto responds to the call from Jimmy Olsen's makeshift signal watch and makes his return. Krypto is quick to defend Jimmy who, along with Superman, falls under attack and is badly injured as a result. Jimmy takes Krypto back to his apartment, and nurses the injured dog back to health. Superman later decides to let Krypto stay with Jimmy when he realizes that Krypto has always preferred the company of younger people, such as himself as a child and Kon-El. Jimmy gives Krypto the secret identity of "Pal", a play on the old Superman's Pal Jimmy Olsen title.

Calmer
During the Green Lantern storyline Sinestro Corps War, Robin enlists Krypto's aid in battling against Superboy-Prime, who has returned to Earth as part of the Sinestro Corps. Under Robin's command, Krypto attacks Prime with feral rage, damaging Prime's armor, but is unfortunately beaten aside, although he buys the heroes enough time for Superman, Power Girl, and Supergirl to join the fight.

During Superman's battle with the villain Atlas, and after Atlas incapacitates such heroes as Steel and Bibbo Bibbowski, Atlas laments that he has not faced a worthy opponent. Just then, Krypto emerges vowing to "hurt this one" because he "loves man" (Superman). Krypto proves to be more than a match for Atlas, revealing Atlas' magical nature to Superman. This is the first and only story to show exactly what Krypto 'thinks', and although it is translated for readers, Krypto 'speaks' in a simplistic manner with broken English, rarely using pronouns. This story also focuses on how Superman has taught Krypto to be much calmer and well-behaved; Superman reassures Lois that Krypto loves her as well. Following the death of Pa Kent and Brainiac's attack on the family farm, Krypto arrives on the front step of the Kent Farm, to protect Martha Kent and provide companionship. A clone of Krypto made by Cadmus made an appearance in Power Girl.

Geoff Johns detailed Krypto's role in Adventure Comics. The character appears alongside the resurrected Conner Kent as his companion and sidekick, with a much more amicable relationship than before Connor's death.

Krypto is instrumental in helping Connor Kent escape the effects of a Black Lantern power ring. He later participates in the final battle against the Black Lantern Corps. The canine is again seen living calmly on the Kent farm, sitting next to Martha.

The New 52
In September 2011, The New 52 rebooted DC's continuity. In this new timeline, Krypto appears as a normal dog with no powers on Krypton. There is mention of a white dog ghost that is protecting Clark Kent. In Action Comics #5 (March 2012), during Krypton's final moments, Jor-El tries to save his family by opening a portal to the Phantom Zone, when suddenly the incarcerated try to escape. Krypto bravely defends the family but is sucked into the Zone, while baby Kal-El shows anguish at losing the dog.

The now-grown Superman rediscovers Krypto in Action Comics #13 (December 2012) after being pulled into the Phantom Zone by the first inhabitant of the prison. At the story's conclusion, Superman is able to bring Krypto back to Earth. With Krypto in critical condition, Superman rushes to the observation deck, exposing Krypto to the sun's radiation. Krypto is then healed at an accelerated rate and is comforted by him. The rapid healing reveals that the dog has developed superpowers just as Kal-El, Kon-El and Kara Zor-El have.

In Superboy #24, Krypto is shown battling polar bears in the Arctic before deciding to join Superboy and Doctor Psycho in battling H.I.V.E. Superboy is knocked out by the Psycho-Pirate, with Krypto by his side.

Later, the threat of Warworld looms high above the Earth. Batman and Superman are blackmailed into recruiting members of their 'clan' and Krypto shows up. He is shown whining after the mention of Superboy, who is suspected of being dead. Krypto assists Superman and Supergirl in fighting various groups of Warworld challengers, as a delaying tactic to save Earth from destruction. Thanks to the secretive efforts of Steel and Batgirl, no innocents are hurt.

Superman becomes sick and voluntarily imprisons himself. Batman recruits Krypto on a mission to the Phantom Zone in an attempt to find a cure; instead they find something extremely dangerous.

DC Rebirth
In DC Rebirth, Superman's previous history prior to The New 52 is restored. Krypto is seen in the DC Rebirth continuity, as the family dog of Superman, Lois and their son Jon. His collar is made out of the belt of an old Superman uniform from the Fortress of Solitude, as a present from Jon.

Krypto is later seen as a loyal companion to Supergirl.

The Super-Sons annual of 2017 explores Krypto's friendship with various super-animals, such as Titus, Batcow, Streaky and Detective Chimp.

Powers, abilities, and equipment
In his original Pre-Crisis incarnation, Krypto possessed the same powers and abilities as an adult Kryptonian, although his physical abilities were proportionate to his smaller size and species. Certain sensory abilities of Krypto's (senses of smell and hearing) were more acute than those of Superman, just as an ordinary dog's senses would be more acute than those of a normal human. He also had super-canine intelligence (approximately human level, though with his canine traits and interests still present); the comics expressed this via the use of thought balloons indicating what Krypto was thinking.

In his current incarnation, Krypto's abilities are essentially identical; however, he possesses normal canine intelligence, though as shown in the storyline with Atlas, Krypto does seem to have a general understanding of speech, and can take initiatives of his own, such as vowing to protect Metropolis from Atlas because of his knowledge of the fact that Superman himself protects and cares for the city, as well as vowing to hurt Atlas for hurting Superman.

In DC League of Super-Pets, There is a new powerful move introduced in the movie called the solar paw Punch. It is when the user absorbs the sun's solar energy, and then strikes their opponent down with one solar-powered strike. However, the move also proves to be incredibly fatal, because once used, the solar paw Punch not only destroys the villain, but also destroys the hero that uses it. Krypto resorted to Using this move to stop Lulu, but survived after being shielded by Ace.

Other versions
 In the Elseworlds story JLA: The Nail Krypto is an early product of an experiment in splicing Kryptonian DNA to Earth creatures. He has a huge distended eye and pseudopods emerging from his back, creating a resemblance to Starro.
 In DC One Million, Krypto is a clone of the original and leader of the Legion of Executive Familiars in the 251st century. His Kryptonian powers have been increased to the ninth power.
 A superpowered Krypto with a canine temperament appeared in All-Star Superman #6.
 Krypto makes a cameo appearance in Superman: Red Son.
 The Silver Age Krypto is one of the "ghosts" in the empty "Planet Krypton" restaurant in The Kingdom: Planet Krypton #1.
 A robot named Krypto, similar to Kelex, appears in the Elseworlds story Superman: Last Son of Earth.
 In the Flashpoint universe, Krypto's skeletal remains are seen in a government underground bunkers, labeled as Subject 2. In a flashback, Subject 2 is shown with young Kal-El, but is separated after Kal fails to appease the government. Later, Sam Lane tours Lionel Luthor and his son, Lex, to see a captive Krypto. Neil Sinclair gives Subject 2 energy to break free and attack, in a rage killing guards and attacking Lex. Subject 2 is killed by soldiers with a kryptonite gun.
 Krypto appears in Tiny Titans and Superman Family Adventures by Art Baltazar and Franco Aureliani. Though his earlier appearances in Tiny Titans have him designed as a puppy, he appears older, taller, and with blue eyes in later issues and in Superman Family Adventures.

In other media

Television

 Krypto appears in The Adventures of Superboy.
 An animatronic toy of Krypto appears in the Batman: The Animated Series episode "Deep Freeze".
 Krypto appears in the Superman: The Animated Series episode "The Last Son of Krypton: Part 1". Additionally, in the episode "Bizarro's World", Bizarro enters the Fortress of Solitude and releases a number of alien animals kept there, including a violent reptilian creature that he adopts and names Krypto.
 Krypto appears in the Justice League Unlimited episode "For the Man Who Has Everything" as part of a dream sequence.
 Krypto appears in Krypto the Superdog, voiced by Samuel Vincent. Similarly to the comics, this version was sent off in a rocket as a puppy before Krypton exploded, though Jor-El sent Krypto off-world first as part of a test flight to ensure his son Kal-El's safety during interstellar travel. While playing with his ball, Krypto inadvertently damaged his rocket, which put him to sleep until he arrived on Earth long after Kal-El had become Superman. Now fully-grown, Krypto acquires superpowers similar to Superman's and is adopted by a young boy named Kevin Whitney with Superman's consent. Additionally, Krypto can communicate with other animals and Kevin via an ear-implanted translator.
 A dog based on Krypto appears in a self-titled episode of Smallville. This version acquired temporary super-strength through Kryptonite-related experiments conducted by LuthorCorp. After being found by Lois Lane and taken to the Kent family's farm, Clark Kent considers naming the dog "Krypto" because of the latter's cryptic origins, but eventually names the dog Shelby after one of Martha Kent's old dogs.
 An unnamed dog resembling Krypto appears in the Legion of Super Heroes episode "Message in a Bottle". This version is a native of the shrunken city of Kandor. After Brainiac 5 turns Kandor's sun from red to yellow, the city's inhabitants receive superpowers.
 Krypto appears in the Batman: The Brave and the Bold episode "Battle of the Superheroes!".
 Krypto appears in the "DC Super-Pets!" segment of DC Nation Shorts, voiced by David Kaye.
 Krypto appears in Justice League Action.
 Krypto appears in the Teen Titans Go! episode "Justice League's Next Top Talent Idol Star: Justice League Edition".
 Krypto appears in Titans, portrayed by dog actors Wrigley, Digby, and Lacey. This version is a golden retriever and test subject of Cadmus Laboratories kept in a Kryptonite-powered cage before they are rescued by Conner and joins the Titans.
 Krypto appears in the DC Super Hero Girls (2019) episode "#BeastsInShow", with vocal effects by Dee Bradley Baker. This version is Kara Danvers' pet who possesses similar powers as her along with urine capable of corroding metal.

Film

 Krypto appears in Superman/Batman: Apocalypse.
 Krypto makes a cameo appearance in Teen Titans Go! To the Movies. This version is one of many superheroes who got their own film.
 Krypto appears in DC League of Super-Pets, voiced by Dwayne Johnson. This version accompanied Kal-El as he was jettisoned off Krypton and remained his close companion long after the latter became Superman, with Krypto adopting the Earth alias of "Bark Kent".

Video games
 Krypto appears in DC Universe Online.
 Krypto appears as an unlockable playable character in Lego Batman 3: Beyond Gotham.
 Krypto appeared as a purchasable playable character in Infinite Crisis, voiced by Frederick Theodore Posenor III.
 Krypto was originally set to appear as a playable character in Injustice 2, but was cut from the game for unknown reasons.
 Krypto appears as an unlockable playable character in Lego DC Super Villains.
 Krypto appears in DC League of Super Pets: The Adventures of Krypto and Ace.

Miscellaneous
 Krypto appears in issue #14 of Superman Adventures.
 Krypto appears in a limited series based on Krypto the Superdog.
 Krypto appears in DC Super Friends #14.
 Krypto appears in Capstone Publishers' DC Super-Pets book Pooches of Power, written by Sarah Stephens and drawn by Art Baltazar.
 A vision of Krypto appears in the Injustice: Gods Among Us prequel comic.
 Krypto appears in DC Super Hero Girls (2015).

See also
 List of fictional dogs
 List of Labrador Retrievers

References

External links
 
 
 Krypto at the Internet Movie Database
 Krypto  at Mike's Amazing World of Comics
 Krypto cartoon and toys resource

Further reading
 

Characters created by Curt Swan
Characters created by Otto Binder
Comics characters introduced in 1955
DC Comics aliens
DC Comics animals
DC Comics characters who can move at superhuman speeds
DC Comics characters with accelerated healing
DC Comics characters with superhuman senses
DC Comics characters with superhuman strength
DC Comics extraterrestrial superheroes
DC Comics superheroes
DC Comics male superheroes
DC Comics sidekicks
Dog superheroes
Fictional characters from Kansas
Fictional characters with superhuman durability or invulnerability
Fictional characters with slowed ageing
Fictional characters with X-ray vision
Fictional characters with nuclear or radiation abilities
Fictional characters with air or wind abilities
Fictional characters with ice or cold abilities
Fictional characters with absorption or parasitic abilities
Fictional characters with energy-manipulation abilities
Fictional characters with fire or heat abilities
Fictional dogs
Kryptonians
Superman characters
Superboy
Legion of Super-Pets